Ludvig Lindgren (born 23 September 1990 in Örebro, Sweden) is a speedway rider who won the 2008 Team U-19 European Champion title. He was a member of Sweden U-21 and U-19 national teams.

His brother Fredrik also rides. His father Tommy rode speedway and ice speedway. In August 2008 it was announced that Lindgren would join his brother at Wolverhampton in the British Elite League.

Honours

World Championships
Individual U-21 World Championship
2008  Pardubice 9th place (7 points)
2009  Goričan 17th place (1 point)
Team U-21 World Championship (Under-21 Speedway World Cup)
2008  Holsted 3rd place (5 points)
2009  Gorzów Wlkp. 3rd place (4 points)

European Championship
Individual U-19 European Championship
2009 7th place in Semi-Final 2
Team U-19 European Championship
2008  Rawicz European Champion (10 points)
2009  Holsted Runner-up (7 points)

Polish Championships
Team Polish Championship (League)
2008 3rd place for Zielona Góra

See also
Sweden national speedway team

References

1990 births
Living people
Swedish speedway riders
Team Speedway Junior European Champions
Wolverhampton Wolves riders
Newcastle Diamonds riders
Sportspeople from Örebro